Daïa (fl. 11th century) is an Algerian Berber saint. She is venerated by the Mozabites of the M'zab region of northern-central Algeria. She is reputed to have lived in a cave (ghār) near Wadi Mzab in the M'zab valley. Kharijite Muslims later flocked to the valley and built the town of Ghardaïa  to escape persecution from the Fatimids in the north.

References

Further reading 
 
 

Algerian Christian saints
11th-century Algerian people
Christian female saints of the Middle Ages
11th-century Christian saints
Year of death unknown
Year of birth unknown
11th-century women